John A. Greenig  (1848 – July 28, 1913), was a professional baseball player who played pitcher in the Major Leagues for the Washington Nationals of the National League on May 9, 1888.

External links

1848 births
1913 deaths
Major League Baseball pitchers
Washington Nationals (1886–1889) players
19th-century baseball players
Oswego Starchboxes players
Charleston Seagulls players
Danbury Hatters players
Galveston Giants players
Baseball players from Pennsylvania